Ian Williams (born 26 April 1942) is a former  Australian rules footballer who played with Geelong in the Victorian Football League (VFL).

Football
On 6 July 1963 he was a member of the Geelong team that were comprehensively and unexpectedly beaten by Fitzroy, 9.13 (67) to 3.13 (31) in the 1963 Miracle Match.

See also
 1963 Miracle Match

Notes

External links 

Living people
1942 births
Australian rules footballers from Victoria (Australia)
Geelong Football Club players
Newtown & Chilwell Football Club players